The Batu 11 Cheras station (Working name: Balakong station) is a Mass Rapid Transit (MRT) station serving the suburb of Batu 11 Cheras, Balakong and Bandar Sungai Long in Selangor, Malaysia. It serves as one of the stations on Klang Valley Mass Rapid Transit (KVMRT) Kajang Line. The station is located at Balakong interchange of the Cheras–Kajang Expressway.

Station Background

Station Layout 
The station has a layout and design similar to that of most other elevated stations on the line (except the terminus and underground stations), with the platform level on the topmost floor, consisting of two sheltered side platforms along a double tracked line and a single concourse housing ticketing facilities between the ground level and the platform level. All levels are linked by lifts, stairways and escalators.

Exits and entrances 
The station has two entrances. The feeder buses operate from the station's feeder bus hub via Entrance A near Jalan Balakong. Entrance B also will directly connected to the new B11 Parkland Residence.

Bus Services

MRT Feeder Bus Services 
With the opening of the MRT Kajang Line, feeder buses also began operating linking the station with several housing areas and cities around the Balakong and Cheras Jaya area. The AEON Cheras Selatan is also accessible through the feeder bus service in this station. The feeder buses operate from the station's feeder bus hub accessed via Entrance A of the station.

Other Bus Services 
RapidKL route 450 (Hentian Kajang - Hub Lebuh Pudu) also pass through this station (KL-bound only) via the bus stop near Dewan Orang Ramai Kampung Batu 11 Cheras (along the  Cheras-Kajang Highway). The bus stop is near the Batu 11 Cheras toll plaza. It requires walking distance to reach the station.

References

External links
 Batu 11 Cheras MRT Station - MRT Website
 Klang Valley Mass Rapid Transit website

Rapid transit stations in Selangor
Sungai Buloh-Kajang Line
Railway stations opened in 2017